The women's long jump event  at the 1997 IAAF World Indoor Championships was held on March 8–9.

Medalists

Results

Qualification
Qualification: 6.60 (Q) or at least 12 best performers (q) qualified for the final.

Final

References

Long jump
Long jump at the World Athletics Indoor Championships
1997 in women's athletics